Ida Østergaard Madsen (born 1994) better known by her first name, Ida, is a Danish singer who won season 5 of the Danish X Factor. After she won, she was signed to Sony Music and her debut single "I Can Be" topped the Danish Singles Chart.

Music career

2012: X Factor

Ida auditioned for season 5 of The X Factor. She became one of the finalists in the "Under 25" category and was mentored by Pernille Rosendahl. On the final, held on 23 March 2012, she won the title with 61,7% of the popular vote with the other finalist Line as runner-up with 38,3% of the votes. DR pronounced after the finale that IDA had most votes in all of the shows.

Performances during X Factor

2012-present: Seize the Day
Immediately after she won, Ida released her winning song as her debut single "I Can Be", which went straight to number 1 on the Danish Singles Chart in its first week of release and was certified gold. On 18 March 2013 she released the single "Underdog", the song peaked to number 8 on the Danish Singles Chart. She features on Mads Langer's song "In These Waters". On 28 October 2013 she released the single "Maybe I Like It", the song peaked to number 37 on the Danish Singles Chart. On 18 November 2013 she released her debut studio album Seize the Day, the album has peaked to number 20 on the Danish Albums Chart.

Discography

Albums

Singles

As lead artist

As featured artist

References

External links
 Ida on Facebook

The X Factor winners
1994 births
Living people
English-language singers from Denmark
21st-century Danish women singers
People from Ringkøbing-Skjern Municipality